Himantolophus crinitus is a species of footballfish, a type of anglerfish. It is endemic to the eastern and southeastern central Atlantic Ocean. The species is currently only known from 11 specimens. Females attain a maximum size of 8.3 cm. While males have not yet been recorded, they are likely to be diminutive in comparison to the females, as is common in the family Himantolophidae.

References

Himantolophidae
Deep sea fish
Fish described in 1988
Taxa named by Erik Bertelsen